Winfrenatia is a genus that contains the oldest-known terrestrial lichen, occurring in fossils preserved in the lower Devonian Rhynie chert. The genus contains the single species Winfrenatia reticulata, named for the texture of its surface. Both the species and the genus were described in 1997.

It comprises a thallus, made of layered, aseptate hyphae, with a number of depressions on its top surface. Each depression contains a net of hyphae holding a sheathed cyanobacterium. The fungus appears to be related to the Zygomycetes, and the photosynthetic partner of photobiont resembles the coccoid cyanobacteria Gloeocapsa and Chroococcidiopsis. There may be two separate algae, making the lichen a symbiosis of three organisms.

References

Fossil taxa described in 1997
Fungi
Devonian life
Lichen genera